Mudroňovo is a small village and municipality in the Komárno District in the Nitra Region of south-west Slovakia.

Geography
The village lies at an altitude of 150 metres and covers an area of 4.007 km².
It has a population of about 108 people.

History
In the 9th century, the territory of Mudroňovo became part of the Kingdom of Hungary. After the Austro-Hungarian army disintegrated in November 1918, Czechoslovak troops occupied the area, later acknowledged internationally by the Treaty of Trianon. The village was founded in 1921. Between 1938 and 1945 territory of Mudroňovo  once more  became part of Miklós Horthy's Hungary through the First Vienna Award. From 1945 until the Velvet Divorce, it was part of Czechoslovakia. Since then it has been part of Slovakia.

Ethnicity
The village is about 90% Slovak and 10% Hungarian.

Facilities
The village has a public library, and a football pitch.

References

External links

Villages and municipalities in the Komárno District